On the Shoulders of Giants: The Story of the Greatest Team You Never Heard Of is a 2011 historical sports documentary film directed by Deborah Morales, written by Kareem Abdul-Jabbar and Anna Waterhouse.  This film tells the story of the All-Black professional basketball team the New York Renaissance or Harlem Rens.

Story
The story of the Harlem Rens and the playing style they exhibited was exactly like the popular brand-new sound of that era, jazz. Like jazz, the Rens were brash, young, strong, and black; all of which frightened the status quo. Which meant that, no matter how good they were, the Rens would not be given the opportunity to prove it by playing against a white team for a professional title. The best they could do was to finally arrange an exhibition game with a white powerhouse known as the Original Celtics. This pivotal game would have no official status but would show the world that the Rens – and African Americans in general – would no longer be ignored. And indeed, all of Harlem expected a win. The Celtics might be world champs, but the Rens – with jazz in their blood, and the moves to prove it – had an impressive win record. Harlem expected a swift victory against their white opponents, and they got one: in reverse. The final score was not even close and the Rens, considered the pride and the hope of Harlem, had lost. It was the Depression that began to turn things around, putting many basketball teams, black and white, on the road. The Rens, with their jazz-inspired moves, played the Original Celtics and other white teams, winning many more games than they lost.  Even though constant contact turned former enemies, the Harlem Rens and the Original Celtics into friends, racism was still a powerful nemesis. Bob Douglas’s goal, to have his team compete professionally against white teams, still seemed out of reach.

But in 1939, two mavericks decided to create the world’s first integrated professional basketball tournament. There had been other “world championships,” but what made this one closer to living up to its grandiose name was that this would be the first time both black and white teams would compete for a national title. Now the Rens would be forced to prove, once and for all, that they weren’t all talk: going up first against another black powerhouse, the Harlem Globetrotters.  If they became victorious, following that game would be their first “official” contest against a white team: the previous year’s champions, the Oshkosh All-Stars. And nobody, but nobody, thought the Rens were ready.

Interviews 
This film has several noteworthy interviews, including with:
Rev. Al Sharpton, Maya Angelou, Cornel West, Rev. Jesse Jackson, Richard Lapchick, Spike Lee, Bob Costas, Dick Enberg, Charles Barkley, John Wooden, David Stern, Bill Russell, Dr. J, Clyde Drexler, Carmelo Anthony

References

External links
 

Documentary films about basketball
2010s English-language films